Classics Live may refer to:

Classics Live (Roger Hodgson album), 2010
Classics Live I and II, a 1986 album by Aerosmith